Hazelbury can refer to:

 Hazelbury Bryan, village in Dorset, England
 Hazelbury Green, a housing estate in Dublin, Ireland
 Hazelbury Manor, manor house in Hazelbury, Wiltshire
 Hazelbury, Wiltshire, a hamlet in Wiltshire, England